The 1997–98 Le Havre AC season was the club's 126th season in existence and the seventh consecutive season in the top flight of French football. In addition to the domestic league, Le Havre participated in this season's edition of the Coupe de France and the Coupe de la Ligue. The season covers the period from 1 July 1997 to 30 June 1998.

Overview 
The team had a very bad start after achieving two wins in 19 matches, but it finished the season in the tenth place.

Players

First-team squad

Transfers

In

Out

Pre-season and friendlies

Competitions

Overview

French Division 1

League table

Results summary

Results by round

Matches

Coupe de France

Coupe de la Ligue

References

External links

Le Havre AC seasons
Le Havre